Marshall Howard Saville (1867–1935) was an American archaeologist, born in Rockport, Massachusetts.  He studied anthropology at Harvard (1889–1894), engaged in field work under F. W. Putnam, and made important discoveries among the mound builders in southern Ohio. After 1903 he was professor of American archæology at Columbia University. He also became director of an important private museum in New York, the Museum of the American Indian (Heye Foundation).  Saville conducted many explorations to various places such as Yucatan, Honduras, Mexico, Ecuador and Colombia.

Saville was a founding member of the Explorers Club, an organization formally established in 1905 and dedicated to promoting exploration and scientific investigation in the field.

Notes

External links 
 Mexican and Central American Archaeological Projects – Electronic articles published by the Division of Anthropology, American Museum of Natural History.
 
 

American anthropologists
American archaeologists
Pre-Columbian scholars
Mesoamerican archaeologists
Mesoamerican anthropologists
American Mesoamericanists
People from Rockport, Massachusetts
Harvard University alumni
1867 births
1935 deaths
19th-century Mesoamericanists
20th-century Mesoamericanists